Linx or LINX may refer to:

 Linx Cargo Care Group, Australian logistics company
 Linx (railway company), a now defunct Norwegian-Swedish railway company
 Linx (software house), a Brazilian business management software company
 LINX (IPC), an inter process communication mechanism developed by ENEA R&D
 Linx (band), a British band that had several UK Top 40 hits during the early 1980s
 London Internet Exchange (or LINX), an internet exchange point in London
 LINX, a medical device for treatment of acid reflux
 Simcoe County LINX, an intercommunity regional bus service in Simcoe County, Ontario, Canada

People
 David Linx (born 1965), Belgian jazz singer, composer, and songwriter

See also
 Link (disambiguation)
 Lynx (disambiguation)